Bill Hewitt may refer to:

 Bill Hewitt (American football) (1909–1947), American football player in the National Football League
 Bill Hewitt (basketball) (born 1944), American retired professional basketball player
 Bill Hewitt (politician) (1930–2016), Australian politician
 Bill Hewitt (sportscaster) (1928–1996), Canadian broadcaster
 C. R. Hewitt (1901–1994), known as Bill, British journalist
 W. A. Hewitt (William Abraham "Billy" Hewitt; 1875–1966), Canadian sports executive and journalist

See also
William Hewitt (disambiguation)